Thiruvananthapuram is the city in Kerala, India. It may also refer to:
 Thiruvananthapuram district, a district in Kerala
 Thiruvananthapuram (Lok Sabha constituency), a constituency in Kerala
 Thiruvananthapuram metropolitan area